Nationality words link to articles with information on the nation's poetry or literature (for instance, Irish or France).

Events

Works published

United Kingdom
 Hannah Cowley, The Maid of Aragon, Part 1 (complete work first published in The Works of mrs Cowley 1813)
 George Crabbe, The Candidate, published anonymously in July
 Herbert Croft, The Abbey of Kilkhampton; or, Monumental Records for the Year 1980, published anonymously; satirical epitaphs on contemporary public figures
 Susannah Harrison, Songs in the Night, "By a Young Woman Under Deep Afflictions", the book went into 15 editions by 1823
 William Hayley, An Essay on History
 Anna Seward, Elegy on Captain Cook, on James Cook, who died February 13, 1779, in Hawaii

United States
 John Andre, "Cow-Chace, in Three Cantos, Published on Occasion of the Rebel General Wayne's Attack of the Refugees Block-House on Hudson's river, on Friday the 21st of July, 1780 Joel Barlow, An Elegy on the Late Honorahble Titus Hosmer Samuel Dexter, The Progress of Science Timothy Dwight IV, attributed, America: or, A Poem on the Settlement of the British Colonies Jonathan Odell, attributed, "The American Times"

Other
 Christoph Martin Wieland, Oberon, Germany

Births
Death years link to the corresponding "[year] in poetry" article:
 March 29 – Walter Watson (died 1854), Scottish poet and weaver
 April 29 – Charles Nodier (died 1844), French philologist, novelist, poet and librarian
 August 17 – George Croly (died 1860), Irish poet, novelist, historian and clergyman
 September 11 (bapt.)'' – John Marriott (died 1825), English clergyman and poet
 Paul Moon James (died 1854), English Quaker banker and poet
 Jahonotin Uvaysiy (died 1845), Uzbek Sufi poet

Deaths
Birth years link to the corresponding "[year] in poetry" article:
 February 18 – Kristijonas Donelaitis (born 1714), Lithuanian poet
 September 6 – George Alexander Stevens (born 1710), English performer, playwright, poet and songwriter
 October 3 – Cynthia Lenige (born 1755), Frisian Dutch poet
 Angom Gopi (born 1710), Indian, Meitei language poet, writer and translator
 Joseph Green (born 1706), Colonial American poet, satirist and clergyman
 Antonina Niemiryczowa  (born 1702), Polish poet

See also

 List of years in poetry
 List of years in literature
 18th century in poetry
 18th century in literature
 French literature of the 18th century
 Sturm und Drang (the conventional translation is "Storm and Stress"; a more literal translation, however, might be "storm and urge", "storm and longing", "storm and drive" or "storm and impulse"), a movement in German literature (including poetry) and music from the late 1760s through the early 1780s
 List of years in poetry
 Poetry

Notes

18th-century poetry
Poetry